Stenoma callicoma is a moth of the family Depressariidae. It is found in French Guiana.

The wingspan is 20–22 mm. The forewings are whitish-violet grey and the hindwings are grey.

References

Moths described in 1916
Taxa named by Edward Meyrick
Stenoma